The École Nationale Supérieure d'Ingénieurs du Mans or ENSIM is a French Engineering school and a member of the Conference of the Directors of French Engineering Schools (CDEFI).

The major fields of study at the ENSIM are vibration, acoustics, sensors and computing.

Studies

Progression
The first three semesters provide students basic instruction in elements specific to engineering, enabling them to acquire core scientific skills, as well as starting to prepare them for their subsequent specialisation. Engineering students encounter the world of work during a four- to ten-week placement as a worker or technician.

The following two semesters provide students with the specific technical knowledge for their chosen specialisation. Students also perfect skills specific to engineering (management, quality, managing innovation, company culture, projects). During this part of their studies students may go on an industrial placement or study abroad.

The last stage of study is a final six-month industrial placement enabling engineering students to familiarise themselves with the demands of their profession.

Specialisations
 Vibrations, acoustics, sensors
Vibrations, acoustics (VA)
Microsystems and optical metrology (MCMO)
Computer science
Real-time and embedded systems architecture (ASTRE)
Person-system interaction (IPS)

List of former directors at  ENSIM

Notes and references

External links 
• Official website
• Presentation

Engineering universities and colleges in France
Schools of informatics
Educational institutions established in 1995
1995 establishments in France